

 

The Outer Circle Trail, also known as the Anniversary Trail, Anniversary Outer Circle Trail, or even the Outer Circle Anniversary Trail, is a shared use path for cyclists and pedestrians, which partly follows the Alamein Line through the inner eastern suburbs of Melbourne, Victoria, Australia.

The trail follows the right-of-way of the old steam era Outer Circle Line. It runs from the Yarra River Trail near the Eastern Freeway at Fairfield, down to Hughesdale Station in the south. The Outer Circle train line opened in 1891. Parts of the trail were opened 100 years later in 1991, hence the Anniversary.

It is heavily used by local residents and recreational cyclists, due to its proximity to other paths, many suburbs, and connecting transport. The path was upgraded in Dec 2006 and is now fully sealed and divided. Signs are still lacking, and there is no lighting for some of the sections, such as between Whitehorse Rd and East Camberwell station. The path, in some stages, follows the direct line of the old railway, in others it weaves through parks, and follows the side of the Alamein Line, continuing beyond Alamein Station underneath the still standing pylons for the overhead wiring to the Gardiners Creek Trail in Malvern East through to Hughesdale Train Station in the south.

Following the Path 
Leaving the Yarra River Trail head south on the Chandler Highway and the Anniversary Outer Circle Trail can be found 0.6km later, just across the bridge that crosses the Eastern Freeway. A safer alternative is to continue along the Yarra River Trail from the Chandler Highway to Willsmere Park - 1.5km. You can cross under the Eastern Freeway at Willsmere Park and traverse to the Anniversary Outer Circle Trail via Hyde Park. 

Despite numerous upgrades to the path, it can still be hard to follow in some sections:

Coming from the north the trail arrives at the junction of Harp Road, High Street and Valerie Street. Located in the junction is a tram stop and some vegetated median strips. Just circumvent all this as well as possible, while maintaining a direct line and the path will be refound on each side of High Street.

340m past the Canterbury Road underpass, there is a Scout hall on the right (south east). Continue straight down the hill, rather than taking the path to the right at this point, which leads to East Camberwell Station.

The path swings to the right (south) at Myrtle Road and continues under the railway bridge. The path parallels the south-west side of Myrtle Road. A short detour at this point, (900m) to the east along Warburton Road, leads to the Maling Road coffee strip.

At Prospect Hill Road, 500 m south of the train line underpass, the path appears to terminate again. Cross Prospect Hill Road and turn right, continuing along 30 m and take a left into Spencer Road. Ride along Spencer Road until Riversdale Park is seen on the left (east). Ride across the park to the pedestrian crossing on the far side of the park at Riversdale Road.

Cross Riversdale Road and proceed left (east) towards Fordham Avenue, then turn right down Fordham Avenue (south). Follow the designated path, and turn right just before the scout hall. From here, the path is clear cut until East Malvern train station.

Between Burwood and Ashburton stations you pass by a small park with a playground (Summerhill Park). The Ferndale Park Trail starts here and acts as an alternative route to the Gardiners Creek Trail.

At the very southern end of the trail you can access the Gardiners Creek Trail. Access is provided via the small footbridge at the south end of Solway St. Due to flood damage the bridge was closed from April 2006 to June 2007. After being open for 3.5 years the bridge was washed away by flood waters very early in the morning of 5 February 2011, after heavy rain resulting from the remnants of Tropical Cyclone Yasi, rendering the bridge impassable.  This was rebuilt and opened in late 2011. The trail seams to terminate here and can be hard to follow onwards.

Take the Gardiners Creek Trail across the bridge and turn left onto the Scotchmans Creek Trail. This path takes you through the Malvern Valley Public Golf Course, Then up and over the footbridge that crosses the Monash Freeway and on past East Malvern Station. Chadstone Shopping Centre and Homesglen Institute of TAFE are nearby.

Head through the station car park to Waverley road and cross at the traffic lights into the Urban forest, this section of the railway has been turned into a nature reserve with two artificial ponds and revegetation of the Gardiners Creek valley. It can be easy to get lost here as there are many unpaved paths that go off the main footpath. 

In the middle of the Urban forest section you will reach Princess Highway, turn right and head 160 meters up the service road and cross at the lights. Turn left and near the bottom of the hill you will rejoin with the path.

The path continues further south through parkland passing Boyd Park and Neerim road for a few hundred meters where it ends at William Street connecting onto the newly built Djerring trail at Hughesdale Station.

Facilities

The path is fully sealed, either bitumen or concrete, and busy road crossings are serviced by pedestrian traffic lights. At various locations along the path, there are barbecues (at the park adjacent to Whitehorse Road crossing and Frog Hollow Reserve). Many parks are dotted along the path, such as ovals, playgrounds, tennis courts and cricket pitches.

Connections 
Yarra River Trail in the North.
The Ferndale Park Trail connects to the trail between Burwood and Ashburton Stations and acts as a short cut to the Gardiners Creek Trail.
A path from Alamein Station leads to Warrigal Rd via Markham Reserve.
Gardiners Creek Trail and Scotchmans Creek Trail in the south.
Djerring trail at the southern end of the path.

See also 
 List of rail trails

References 

Bike rides around Melbourne 3rd edition, 2009, Julia Blunden, Open Spaces Publishing, 
Bike Paths Victoria sixth edition, 2004. Edited and published by Sabey & Associates Pty Ltd. pp104.

External links 
 Outer Circle Railway Trail - description of the trail
Boroondara BUG - Detailed map of the Trail
Boroondara BUG's proposal to close the gap between Markham Reserve and Holmesglen Station via a shared path alongside Warrigal Road. Creating a link to the Waverley Rail Trail.

Bike paths in Melbourne
Rail trails in Victoria (Australia)